Route 177 is a  state highway in central Connecticut, running from Plainville to Canton.

Route description
Route 177 begins as Town Line Road at an intersection with Route 10 in Plainville, just north of the Southington town line. It heads west for  then turns north onto South Washington Street. From this intersection, South Washington Street continues one way southbound into Southington as Birch Street (SR 532), and ends at Route 10. Route 177 continues north along South Washington Street to the town center of Plainville, where it intersects with Route 372 and becomes North Washington Street. After crossing the Pequabuck River, it soon has a junction with Route 72, connecting with it via a partial interchange allowing access to and from points east. North of the intersection, the road becomes Unionville Avenue as it continues north into the town of Farmington.

Route 177 soon enters the Unionville section of Farmington, where the road becomes South Main Street. After crossing the Farmington River into the center of Unionville, it intersects Route 4. North of here, Route 177 continues as Lovely Street. The road ends  later at an intersection with US 44 and US 202 near Bond Pond in Canton center.

History
The route from Plainville to Unionville was designated in 1922 as State Highway 160, while that from Unionville to Canton center was known as State Highway 320. In the 1932 state highway renumbering, these two state highways were combined into a single route, Route 177. Similar to the older highways it replaced, Route 177 originally ran from Route 372 (then Route 72) in Plainville to its current northern terminus at US 44 in Canton. In 1962, it was extended south to its current southern terminus.

Junction list

References

External links

177
Transportation in Hartford County, Connecticut